Martin Ellerby (1957, Worksop, Nottinghamshire, England) is an English composer. He was educated at the Royal College of Music, London, where he was taught by Joseph Horovitz.

His catalogue features works for orchestra, chorus, concert band, brass band, ballet and various instrumental ensembles. Performances include the BBC Proms, the Leipzig Gewandhaus and many international festivals. Among his students was Daniel Giorgetti.

Ellerby's 2007 piece Elgar Variations, honoring British composer Sir Edward Elgar, was used as the test piece for the Championship section of the 2013 North American Brass Band Association competition.

Works
Paris Sketches (1994) for wiestra
Elgar Variations (2007) for Brass Band 
Sinfonia Aqua (2015) for woodwind orchestra
Terra Australis (2005) for Brass Band

References

External links
 Official homepage

1957 births
Living people
20th-century English composers
20th-century classical composers
20th-century British male musicians
21st-century classical composers
21st-century British male musicians
Alumni of the Royal College of Music
Brass band composers
English classical composers
English male classical composers
People from Worksop